The Calenberg Uplands are a landscape unit in the Weser-Leine Uplands in Lower Saxony, Germany. They border on the Calenberg Land to the north and merge into the Weser Uplands in the west and the Leine Uplands in the east. They are dissected by the Deister-Süntel and Aue valleys.

The following ridges belong to the Calenberg Uplands:
 Bückeberg – 
 Deister – 
 Harrl – 
 Kleiner Deister (L) – 
 Nesselberg (L) – 
 Osterwald (L) – 
 Süntel (W) – 
 Wesergebirge (W) – 

Whilst the southwestern ridges of the Süntel and Weser Hills also belong to the Weser Uplands (W), the eastern heights of the Osterwald, Nesselberg and Kleiner Deister are grouped with the Leine Uplands (L).

References

External links 
Landscape fact file by the Federal Agency for Nature Conservation (with map)

Central Uplands

!Calenberg Uplands
Geography of Lower Saxony
Regions of Lower Saxony